Maur Hill–Mount Academy is a coed Catholic, college prep, boarding high school in Atchison, Kansas. It is located in the Roman Catholic Archdiocese of Kansas City in Kansas and sponsored by the St. Benedict's Abbey (monastery) and Mount St. Scholastica (convent) in Atchison, KS. It became Maur Hill–Mount Academy with the merger of the two long established schools: Maur Hill Prep School (1919) was an all-boys school and Mount St. Scholastica Academy (1863), an all-girls school.

The student population is around 190-220 students (about 80-90 boarding and 100-120 day students from the surrounding area. Boarding students attend from many states across the US and approximately 50 of the boarding students are international students.

Academics
Regular high school courses, honors courses, college courses and AP courses are all available. Upper-level students also are able to take college courses at Benedictine College. The school accepts student of average or above average intelligence that plan to continue their education into college.

Accreditation and association memberships
It is accredited by AdvancED and maintains memberships or association in the Secondary School Admission Test Board, Catholic Boarding School Association, Small Boarding School Association, the Cardinal Newman Society, and the National Catholic Education Association.

Although an independent school with primary sponsorship from St. Benedict's Abbey and the Mount St. Scholastica Monastery, it is recognized and maintains connection with Roman Catholic Archdiocese of Kansas City in Kansas.

The school competes athletically and academically as a member of the nine-school Northeast Kansas League.

Notable alumni
 Mike Haverty  (Maur Hill Prep School, 1962) – former president and CEO of Kansas City Southern Railway
 Mike Kuckelman (Maur Hill Prep School, ????) - Chairman of the Kansas Republican Party
 Deran Sarafian (Maur Hill Prep School, 1975) – television producer and director, involved in CSI, House M.D., and Lost

References

External links
 School Website

Roman Catholic Archdiocese of Kansas City in Kansas
Benedictine secondary schools
Catholic secondary schools in Kansas
Catholic boarding schools in the United States
Educational institutions established in 2003
Schools in Atchison County, Kansas
Boarding schools in Kansas
2003 establishments in Kansas